Some botanical gardens in the Czech Republic have collections consisting entirely of Czech Republic native and endemic species; most have a collection that include plants from around the world. Czech Republic botanical gardens and arboreta are administered by local governments, some are privately owned.

List of botanical gardens
 Brno
 Botanical gardens and arboretum of Mendel University of Agriculture and Forestry in Brno
 Botanical gardens of the Faculty of Natural Sciences of Masaryk University
 Hradec Králové, Botanical gardens of medicinal plants of the Pharmaceutical Faculty of Charles University
 Kostelec nad Černými lesy, Arboretum of the Czech Agricultural University in Prague
 Liberec, Liberec botanical gardens
 Olomouc
 Palacký University of Olomouc Botanical gardens 
 Olomouc Exhibition Centre of Flora
 Ostrava, Botanical gardens of the Faculty of Natural Sciences of Ostrava University
 Plzeň
 Plzeň zoological and botanical gardens
 Sofronka Arboretum of the Forestry and Game Management Research Institute (VÚLHM)
 Prague
 Praha 2, Na Slupi, Botanical gardens of the Faculty of Natural Sciences of Charles University
 Praha 8, Troja, Botanical gardens of the City of Prague
 Praha 9, Malešice botanical gardens
 Průhonice
 Botanical department of the Czech Academy of Sciences
 Dendrological gardens of the Silva Tarouca Research Institute for Landscape and Ornamental Horticulture
 Rakovník, Botanical gardens of the Rakovník College of Agriculture 
 Tábor, Botanical gardens of the Tabor Higher Specialist School and College of Agriculture
 Teplice, Botanical gardens of the City of Teplice

References 

Czech Republic
Botanical gardens